Anwar Salama (born 14 March 1947) is an Egyptian football manager.

References

1947 births
Living people
Egyptian footballers
Al Ahly SC players
Egyptian football managers
Al Ahly SC managers
Egypt national football team managers
Al Masry SC managers
ENPPI SC managers
Al-Ittihad Tripoli managers
Tala'ea El Gaish SC managers
Egyptian Premier League managers
Egyptian expatriate footballers
Expatriate footballers in Libya
Egyptian expatriate sportspeople in Libya
Association footballers not categorized by position